The Tower is the debut solo studio album by Bob Catley, released by Frontiers Records in 1998.

Bob Catley collaborated with Ten frontman, and longstanding Magnum fan, Gary Hughes who wrote all the songs on The Tower. He wrote the songs having in mind classic Magnum tunes and trying to combine the epic scope of On a Storyteller's Night with Wings of Heaven commercial appeal.

"I dug out all my classic old Magnum records and they inspired me to write in this style for Bob. Tony Clarkin is such a great writer. I think he's one of the most underrated writers around. Songs like "Les Mort Dansant" and "How Far Jerusalem" are simply stunning pieces of songwriting." — Gary Hughes

Track listing 
All songs written by Gary Hughes.

Disc 1
 "Dreams" — 6:46
 "Scream" — 7:32
 "Far Away" — 6:01
 "Deep Winter" — 5:25
 "Fire and Ice" — 5:33
 "Madrigal" — 6:43
 "Steel" — 5:00
 "The Tower" — 6:33
 "Fear of the Dark" — 6:31
 "Epilogue" [Instrumental] — 1:53

Disc 2 (Japanese Release)
 "Dreams" [Live] — 6:46
 "Scream" [Live] — 7:32
 "Far Away" [Live] — 6:01
 "Deep Winter" [Live] — 5:25
 "Lonely Night" [Live] (Tony Clarkin) — 0:00
 "Fire and Ice" [Live] — 5:33
 "On a Storyteller's Night" [Live] (Tony Clarkin) — 0:00
 "The Tower" [Live] — 6:33
 "Fear of the Dark" [Live] — 6:31
 "Just Like an Arrow" [Live] (Tony Clarkin) — 0:00

Personnel
Bob Catley — vocals
Gary Hughes — vocals, bass, keyboards
Vinny Burns — guitars
Greg Morgan — drums

Production
Produced by Gary Hughes
Engineered and Mixing by Ray Brophy
Recorded at Startrack Studios, Manchester
Mixed at Gracieland, Rochdale
Mastered by John Blamire at The Digital Audio Company
Additional Engineering by Neil Amison at Gracieland, Rochdale

References

External links
 www.bobcatley.com — Official Bob Catley site

Bob Catley albums
1998 albums
Albums produced by Gary Hughes
Frontiers Records albums